Adolphe-François Savaria (May 21, 1848 – July 16, 1929) was a merchant and political figure in Quebec. He represented Shefford in the Legislative Assembly of Quebec from 1892 to 1897 as a Conservative.

Early life 
He was born in Saint-Pie, Canada East, the son of Isidore Savaria and Josephte Messier, and established himself as a merchant in Waterloo.

Career 
He served on the municipal council for Waterloo and was mayor from 1892 to 1894. Savaria ran unsuccessfully for a seat in the Quebec assembly in 1886 and 1888. He was defeated by Tancrède Boucher de Grosbois when he ran for reelection in 1897. Savaria served as postmaster for Waterloo from 1915 to 1929.

Family 
He was married twice: to Zoé Marin in 1872 and to Adéline Benoît in 1895.

Death 
Savaria died in Waterloo at the age of 81.

References
 

Conservative Party of Quebec MNAs
Mayors of places in Quebec
1848 births
1929 deaths